Frank Edmund Mouncer (22 November 1920 – 1977) was an English professional footballer who played as a full-back.

References

1920 births
1977 deaths
Footballers from Grimsby
English footballers
Association football fullbacks
Humber United F.C. players
Grimsby Town F.C. players
English Football League players